Bulatnikovo is a rural locality (a selo) in Kovarditskoye Rural Settlement, Muromsky District, Vladimir Oblast, Russia. The population was 705 as of 2010. There are 7 streets.

Geography 
Bulatnikovo is located 23 km northwest of Murom (the district's administrative centre) by road. Fedorkovo is the nearest rural locality.

References 

Rural localities in Muromsky District
Muromsky Uyezd